In Euclidean geometry, of special interest are involutions which are linear or affine transformations over the Euclidean space Rn. Such involutions are easy to characterize and they can be described geometrically.

Linear involutions
To give a linear involution is the same as giving an involutory matrix, a square matrix A such that

where I is the identity matrix.

It is a quick check that a square matrix D whose elements are all zero off the main diagonal and ±1 on the diagonal, that is, a signature matrix of the form

satisfies (1), i.e. is the matrix of a linear involution. It turns out that all the matrices satisfying (1) are of the form 
A=U −1DU, 
where U is invertible and D is as above. That is to say, the matrix of any linear involution  is of the form D  up to a matrix similarity. Geometrically this means that any  linear involution can be obtained by taking oblique reflections against any number from 0 through n hyperplanes going through the origin. (The term oblique reflection as used here includes ordinary reflections.)

One can easily verify that A represents a linear involution if and only if A has the form
A = ±(2P - I) 
for a linear projection P.

Affine involutions

If A represents a linear involution, then x→A(x−b)+b is an affine involution. One can check that any affine involution in fact has this form. Geometrically this means that any  affine involution can be obtained by taking oblique reflections against any number from 0 through n hyperplanes going through a point b. 

Affine involutions can be categorized by the dimension of the affine space of fixed points; this corresponds to the number of values 1 on the diagonal of the similar matrix D (see above), i.e., the dimension of the eigenspace for eigenvalue 1.

The affine involutions in 3D are:
 the identity
 the oblique reflection in respect to a plane
 the oblique reflection in respect to a line
 the reflection in respect to a point.

Isometric involutions
In the case that the eigenspace for eigenvalue 1 is the orthogonal complement of that for eigenvalue −1, i.e., every eigenvector with eigenvalue 1 is orthogonal to every eigenvector with eigenvalue −1, such an affine involution is an isometry. The two extreme cases for which this always applies are the identity function and inversion in a point.

The other involutive isometries are inversion in a line (in 2D, 3D, and up; this is in 2D a reflection, and in 3D a rotation about the line by 180°), inversion in a plane (in 3D and up; in 3D this is a reflection in a plane), inversion in a 3D space (in 3D: the identity), etc.

References 

Affine geometry